The 2017–18 3. Liga was the 25th season of the third-tier football league of Slovakia since its establishment in 1993. The league is composed of 66 teams divided in four groups of 16 teams each; only 3. liga Západ (West) includes 18 teams. Teams are divided into four divisions: 3. liga Bratislava, 3. liga Západ (West), 3. liga Stred (Central), 3. liga Východ (Eastern), according to geographical separation.

TIPOS III. liga Bratislava

Locations

League table

Top goalscorers 
.

TIPOS III. liga Západ
source:

Locations

League table

Top goalscorers 
.

III. liga Stred
source:

Locations

League table

Top goalscorers 
.

III. liga Východ
source:

Locations

League table

Top goalscorers 
.

References

3. Liga (Slovakia) seasons
3
Slovak Third League